1021 Flammario, provisional designation , is a dark background asteroid from the central regions of the asteroid belt, approximately  in diameter. It was discovered on 11 March 1924, by German astronomer Max Wolf at the Heidelberg-Königstuhl State Observatory in Heidelberg, Germany. The asteroid was named after French astronomer Camille Flammarion. The uncommon F-type asteroid has a rotation period of 12.16 hours.

Orbit and classification 

Flammario is a non-family asteroid from the main belt's background population. It orbits the Sun in the central asteroid belt at a distance of 2.0–3.5 AU once every 4 years and 6 months (1,654 days; semi-major axis of 2.74 AU). Its orbit has an eccentricity of 0.29 and an inclination of 16° with respect to the ecliptic.

The body's observation arc begins at the Pulkovo Observatory near Saint Petersburg, Russia, in January 1928, more than four years after its official discovery observation at Heidelberg.

Physical characteristics 

In the SMASS classification, Flammario is a "bright" carbonaceous B-type, while it is an uncommon F-type asteroid in the Tholen taxonomy. (The SMASS taxonomic scheme classifies all F-types as B-type asteroids). More recent polarimetric observations also characterized the asteroid as a dark F-type.

Rotation period 

Several rotational lightcurves of Flammario have been obtained from photometric observations since the 1990s. Analysis of the best-rated lightcurve obtained by French amateur astronomer Laurent Bernasconi in January 2005 gave a rotation period of 12.160 hours with a consolidated brightness amplitude between 0.14 and 0.40 magnitude.

Poles 

In 2016, a modeled lightcurve using photometric data from various sources, rendered a similar sidereal period of 12.15186 hours and two spin axes of (32.0°, 22.0°) and (216.0°, 55.0°) in ecliptic coordinates.

Diameter and albedo 

According to the surveys carried out by the Infrared Astronomical Satellite IRAS, the Japanese Akari satellite and the NEOWISE mission of NASA's Wide-field Infrared Survey Explorer, Flammario measures between 84.78 and 105 kilometers in diameter and its surface has a low albedo between 0.04 and 0.05.

The Collaborative Asteroid Lightcurve Link adopts the results obtained by IRAS, that is, an albedo of 0.0458 and a diameter of 99.39 kilometers based on an absolute magnitude of 8.98.

Mass, density and porosity 

Small Solar System bodies may have 20% of more porosity (which decreases with the size of the body due to self-gravity). The carbonaceous outer-belt asteroids typically show a higher macroporosity than the basaltic, stony asteroids from the inner regions of the asteroid belt.

Naming 

This minor planet was named after renowned French astronomer Camille Flammarion (1842–1925), who founded the French Astronomical Society and the astronomical journal L'Astronomie in the 1880s. The official naming citation was mentioned in The Names of the Minor Planets by Paul Herget in 1955. The lunar crater Flammarion as well as the crater Flammarion on Mars were also named in his honor.

References

External links 
 Asteroid Lightcurve Database (LCDB), query form (info )
 Dictionary of Minor Planet Names, Google books
 Asteroids and comets rotation curves, CdR – Geneva Observatory, Raoul Behrend
 Discovery Circumstances: Numbered Minor Planets (1)-(5000) – Minor Planet Center
 
 

001021
Discoveries by Max Wolf
Named minor planets
001021
001021
19240311